The Springfield Presbyterian Church is located on Morris Avenue (NJ 82) in downtown Springfield, New Jersey, United States. It was first established in 1745.

During the Battle of Springfield in the Revolutionary War, the church was burned by British and Loyalist troops passing through the town on their way to nearby Hobart Gap, since it had been used to store ammunition for the Continental Army.

In 1990, it was added to the National Register of Historic Places, being listed as the First Congregation of the Presbyterian Church at Springfield.

See also
National Register of Historic Places listings in Union County, New Jersey

References

External links 

Church website

Federal architecture in New Jersey
Greek Revival church buildings in New Jersey
Gothic Revival architecture in New Jersey 
Churches completed in 1780
Presbyterian churches in New Jersey
American Revolutionary War sites
1745 establishments in New Jersey
Churches in Union County, New Jersey
Churches on the National Register of Historic Places in New Jersey
National Register of Historic Places in Union County, New Jersey
Springfield Township, Union County, New Jersey
18th-century Presbyterian church buildings in the United States